Nant is an alpine pasture located in the municipality of Bex, in Switzerland. Its name is often used to describe the small valley itself: "vallon de Nant".

References

Landforms of the canton of Vaud